The Vibrio Holin Family (TC# 1.E.30) consists of small proteins 50 to 65 amino acyl residues in length that exhibit a single N-terminal transmembrane domain.  A representative list of proteins belonging to the Vibrio Holin family can be found in the Transporter Classification Database.

See also 
 Holin
 Lysin
 Transporter Classification Database

References 

Protein families
Membrane proteins
Transmembrane proteins
Transmembrane transporters
Transport proteins
Integral membrane proteins